LDC Publishers is a department of Law Development Centre charged with printing and publishing legal materials for students, legal profession and the general public in liaison with the department of Research, Law Reform and Publications. It comprises two sections, namely, Printing Press and Bookshop. It publishes law reports and high court bulletins.  It also publishes Compendium of Law Relating to Acts and Statutes, The Scope Magazine, and other publications and books for sale to students and the general public.

History
The Law Development Center (LDC) was established in 1970 by the Law Development Centre Act, as a government-owned institution of higher learning responsible for "research, law reform, publications, law reporting and community legal services". LDC publishers is one of the departments of the Law Development Center.

Authors
B. J. Odoki, 7 books 
Uganda., 5 books 
O. A. P. Okumu, 1 book 
Syed Shah Zeyaur Rahman, 1 book 
Michael Wilkinson, 1 book

References 

Book publishing companies of Uganda
Legal publishers
Publishing companies established in 1970
Kumusha